Estoloides alboscutellaris is a species of beetle in the family Cerambycidae. It was described by Stephan von Breuning in 1943. It is known from Ecuador and French Guiana.

References

Estoloides
Beetles described in 1943
Beetles of Central America